The LSWR 46 Class was a class of 4-4-0 passenger tank locomotive designed by William Adams for the London and South Western Railway. No examples have been preserved.

Background

The first design by William Adams, the twelve members of the 46 Class represent an interim design to supplement the Beattie Well Tanks that were already in service. All were built from 1879, and were intended for light suburban passenger traffic around London and the South Coast on the LSWR railway network. This was the second (and final) 4-4-0T design on the LSWR, but the first specifically intended for the London suburban services - the LSWR 318 class were built in 1875 for the routes west of Exeter and transferred to London from 1876. The 46 class were later rostered on local passenger services under the ownership of the Southern Railway, though none of the class survived into British Railways control.  In consequence, none have survived into preservation.

Construction history

The 46 Class was designed as a response to the requirements of the LSWR to have a range of newer, more reliable locomotives for use on their network.  As a result, Adams intended the 46 Class to be an immediate stop-gap measure that could be utilised on suburban passenger services while he devised a better solution to the railway's motive power problem. This solution would eventually prove to be the 415 Class of 4-4-2T locomotive.

The construction of the 46 Class was contracted out by the LSWR in order to speed construction and delivery.  The contractor selected was Beyer, Peacock and Company, which manufactured 12 4-4-0 tank locomotives in 1879. After only four years in service, the entire class was eventually converted to the 4-4-2 'radial' tank design between 1883 and 1886, following the successful introduction of the '415' Class in 1882 on London's suburban network.

The reasoning behind the conversion was one of standardization, as various parts could be exchanged between both classes, and in consequence, the only glaringly obvious difference between the two classes, apart from the large side tanks on the 46 class, was the positioning of the safety valves on the boiler. However, the conversion resulted in a heavier locomotive, as an increase in water capacity was incorporated, as was an extended coal bunker to enable longer journeys to be achieved.  This entailed the extension of the locomotive's frames, resulting in a longer locomotive than the original 4-4-0 design.

Livery and numbering

LSWR

After a period in the LSWR's early Yellow Ochre/Brown passenger livery, the 46 Class was outshopped in LSWR Passenger Sage Green livery, with black edging and black and white lining. Numbering was in gilt, as was the 'LSWR' lettering on the water tank side.

Under the LSWR numbering policy, the number of the first locomotive of a new design became the number of the class.  As in this case the first locomotive was numbered 46, the class became known as the '46 Class.'  The rest of the class were numbered 123, 124, 130, 132, 133 and 374–379.

LSWR numbering policy was, and continues to be, a highly confusing topic because the LSWR did not allocate a numerical series to a new class of locomotive.  This resulted in many different classes of locomotives being numbered and mixed within series.

From 1903 to 1905, the locomotives were re-numbered according to the LSWR's duplicate numbering system. This meant that a '0' prefix was added to the LSWR numbers, and that the doyen of the class, number 46 became 046.

Southern
Nine of the locomotives were inherited by the Southern Railway at the beginning of 1923; two were withdrawn later that year, five more in 1924 and two in 1925. The last two to remain in service, nos. 0375 and 0377, had been used on the  branch.

Operational details

The class, despite its long period of service, was regarded as a stop-gap measure to assist the smooth operation of LSWR passenger services.  This belief continued despite the attempt at standardization in 1883 by converting the locomotives to 4-4-2 wheel arrangement.
The class was eventually demoted to rural local passenger services by the LSWR, along with their 415 class cousins. One locomotive, number 0376 (376), was withdrawn early in February 1914, though was sold to the Brecon and Merthyr Railway in South Wales. This locomotive was re-numbered 44 when in service on this railway, passing to the Great Western Railway on 1 July 1922 who allocated it number 1391. However it was withdrawn later that year before it was renumbered.

The class withdrawal programme ended temporarily with the onset of the First World War, where motive power shortages effectively extended their working lives until they became surplus to requirements during the years following the war. As a result, four of the class were withdrawn in November 1921, with the remaining seven examples in service just making it to grouping and Southern Railway ownership in 1923.  The withdrawals continued, with the final serviceable example being withdrawn in October 1925.

Because of the early withdrawal of the class during the 1920s, no examples survived to be earmarked for preservation.

References

 
 
 
 
 

046
4-4-0T locomotives
4-4-2T locomotives
Beyer, Peacock locomotives
Railway locomotives introduced in 1879
Scrapped locomotives
Standard gauge steam locomotives of Great Britain